Wintersun is a melodic death metal band.

Wintersun may also refer to:

Wintersun (album), the debut album from the aforementioned band
"Wintersun" (instrumental), a 2001 single by the string quartet Bond
Undercover: Operation Wintersun, a computer game published by Lighthouse Interactive